Trimethylthiazoline (TMT; sometimes called fox odor) is a constituent of fox urine and feces that may be an innately aversive odor to rodents. The chemical is liquid at room temperature and has a very light yellow color which darkens on oxygen exposure over time.

Sources
TMT was first isolated from cooked beef in 1977, and has been identified also in non-animal material such as wheat flour extrudates.  It was identified in fox feces by Vernet-Maury in 1980.

Effects
Vernet-Maury reported that TMT is effective at inducing antipredator behavior in rats.

TMT has been called an "innate threat stimulus" because of how it "induces a number of fear and defensive behaviors" in naive mice and rats.

Not all research has come to the same conclusions, however; with some questioning the role of TMT in the aversive effects of fox feces.  One study, for example, found that cat odor, but not TMT, elicits specific defensive behaviors in rats.

Immunoprecipitation of RNA transcripts of murine olfactory cells have identified an enriched pool of odorant receptors activated by TMT, including five receptors (Olfr20, Olfr30, Olfr57, Olfr376, Olfr491) that localize to the dorsal portion of the olfactory epithelium which can mediate fear behaviour.

References 

Thiazolines